KBHH (95.3 MHz, Forge 95.3 FM) is an FM radio station licensed to Kerman, California, originally going on the air in 2001. The station's broadcast license is held by the Farmworker Educational Radio Network, Inc.  It airs an English/Spanish language radio format of Top 40 (CHR) music and news as a non-commercial outlet, serving Fresno County.

The station has an effective radiated power (ERP) of 6,000 watts, broadcasting from a tower at 100 meters (328 feet) in height above average terrain (HAAT).  The tower is southwest of Fresno, in Cantua Creek, California.

History

Launch (1996-2007)
In May 1996, Farmworker Educational Radio Network, Inc., was among the applicants to the Federal Communications Commission (FCC) for a construction permit for a new radio station in Kernan. After a settlement among the applicants was reached in January 1998, the FCC granted the permit on April 16, 1998, with a scheduled expiration date of April 16, 2001. The new station was assigned call sign "KBHH" on July 17, 1998. After construction and testing were completed in April 2001, the station was granted its broadcast license on June 18, 2001.

Periods of silence (2008-2014)
On November 14, 2008, the station's signal went dark in response to the late-2000s recession. On December 4, 2008, the station applied to the FCC for special temporary authority to remain silent, asserting that it was "unable to operate profitably in the current economic climate". The station reported that it resumed broadcasting on November 12, 2009. This is just one day short of the one year of continuous silence that would have left the station's broadcast license subject to automatic forfeiture and cancellation.

Four days later, on November 16, 2009, KBHH again fell silent. Citing the same conditions in its December 7, 2009, request to remain off the air, the station was granted authorization to remain silent on March 10, 2010, with a scheduled expiration date of September 7, 2010. The station reported to the FCC it resumed operations "at licensed parameters" on November 10, 2010, again just two days before the one-year maximum. Two days later, on November 12, 2010, the station once again went off the air. Again citing the inability to operate profitably in a December 2, 2010, FCC filing, the station was granted authority to remain silent on September 29, 2011, with a firm expiration date of November 12, 2011.

Moving the transmitter
In March 2011, with the station still off the air, KBHH management applied to the FCC to relocate its broadcast transmitter southwest of Fresno to the top of a hill near Cantua Creek.  This move would improve signal coverage in the Fresno area without increasing power output. To accommodate the move, KBHH also asked the FCC to relocate under-construction KAAX in Avenal, California, from its originally permitted 95.1 MHz to 106.9 MHz to prevent interference due to short-spacing of the two tower sites. The FCC approved the plan and issued a new construction permit to make these changes on October 17, 2011, with a scheduled expiration of October 17, 2014.

Regional Mexican era (2014-2018)
Michael Nowakowski, the vice-president of the Communications Fund of the Cesar Chavez Foundation led the coalition to re-launch KBHH in the Central Valley. Alongside Bill Barquin, chief operation officer, both helped relaunch the station in October 2014, branded as "La Campesina 95.3 FM" as part of the Radio Campesina Network. ("Campesina" is a Spanish word meaning "peasant" or "farmworker".) Anthony Chavez, president of Farmworker Educational Radio Network, Inc., is the youngest son of American farm worker, labor leader, and civil rights activist César Chávez.  KBHH is one of about a dozen Radio Campesina stations in California, Arizona, Nevada and Washington serving farmworkers.

CHR era (2019-present)
On June 9, 2019, KBHH flipped to CHR, branded as "Forge 95.3". The programs are presented in English, and the playlist features current-based pop music in English and Spanish. The station has opened a request line, where listeners can make music suggestions. KBHH has already begun introducing personalities under the new format. The format change was due to Farmworker Educational acquiring KVPW from the EMF two months later, with the "La Campesina" affiliation moving there after that sale's closure. This makes KBHH the second station under Farmworker Educational's portfolio to air a format other than Regional Mexican, the other being KBDS in the San Joaquin Valley.

Competition
KBHH competes with two other CHR stations in the Fresno area, which include Rhythmic outlets KBOS-FM and KSEQ.

References

External links

BHH
Radio stations established in 2001
BHH
2001 establishments in California
Contemporary hit radio stations in the United States